Wareemba is a suburb in the Inner West of Sydney in the state of New South Wales, Australia. Wareemba is 12 kilometres west of the Sydney central business district in the local government area of the City of Canada Bay. Wareemba sits on the eastern shore of Hen and Chicken Bay, on the Parramatta River. It is almost the smallest suburb in Sydney by land area.

History
European settlement of the area began in the 1830s, with land mainly used for farming. The suburb was originally part of neighbouring suburb Abbotsford until declared a separate suburb in 1993. The name Wareemba comes from an Aboriginal word meaning "place where sweet water meets salt water".

Commercial area
Wareemba has a small group of shops located on Great North Road. Wareemba is famous for its coffee shops, including one business that combines fruit shop with coffee shop.

Churches
Wareemba Gospel Hall is in Coranto Street.

Population
The suburb of Wareemba had a population of 1,546 people, according to the 2016 Census of Population and Housing.

Demographics
Like the nearby suburbs of Haberfield and Five Dock, Wareemba has a large population of residents with Italian ancestry (22.6%).

67.0% of people were born in Australia with the next most common countries of birth being Italy (10.6%), England (2.5%), New Zealand (1.4%), China (1.3%) and Scotland (0.8%). 68.3% of people only spoke English at home. Other languages spoken at home included Italian at 17.5%. The most common responses for religion were Catholic (51.6%), no religion (18.4%), Anglican (8.2%) and Eastern Orthodox (3.7%). 7.7% of the population chose not to state their religion.

References

Suburbs of Sydney
City of Canada Bay